Inside is the debut studio album released by British rock band Presence, released in the UK through Reality Records in 1992, and in the US and Canada through Smash Records, a subsidiary of Island Records, in 1993. Although Inside was well received by critics, it was a commercial failure, and the band dissolved shortly afterwards. Nevertheless, this band does spark interest among some Cure fans because of the involvement of Lol Tolhurst.

In December 2011, this album was made available in MP3 format through Amazon and iTunes.

Reception
Staff writer Dave Thompson of Allmusic gave the album four out of five stars, writing "for anybody still reeling from the horrors of the Cure's own most recent releases, if Wish was the cure, then Inside was the plague with the built-in immunity."

Track listing
All tracks written by Biddles, Tolhurst, and Youdell, except where noted.

Personnel

Presence
Gary Biddles — vocals
Alan Burgess — drums
Roberto Soave — bass guitar
Rob Steen — guitar
Laurence Tolhurst — keyboard
Chris Youdell — keyboard

Production
Produced by Presence
Engineered by Jim Russell, assisted by Alex Byrd
Mixed by Ingmar Kiang, assisted by Anthony Fisher
Mastered by Greg Calbi
Art direction – Deborah Melian
Design and Logo – Rob Steen
Artwork and Photography – Jeremy Baile and Darryl Schiff

References

External links
 
 

1992 debut albums
Presence (band) albums